was a Japanese actor and voice actor.

Death
Amenomori died of cirrhosis on April 9, 1984. At the time of his death he was represented by Aoni Production.

Notable voice work
Ai Shite Knight (Juliano) final role
Gatchaman (Debu)
Time Bokan Series
Time Bokan (Hassan, Genghis Khan)
Otasukeman (Bunzaemon)

Tensai Bakabon Series (Bakabon's Papa)
Dr. Slump and Arale-chan (Komatta-chan)
Doraemon NTV version (Sensei)
Do It! Yasuji's Pornorama (Busuo's father)
Pāman (Ohyama-sensei)
Dog of Flanders (Michel)
Magical Princess Minky Momo (Lilly's Papa)
Future Boy Conan (Mou)

Moomin (The Hemulen)
Princess Knight (Duke Jeralmin)
Andersen Stories (Circus Owner, Anna's Father)

Replacements
After Amenomori's death, his roles were given to the following:

Minoru Yada (Tanoshii Moomin Ikka: The Hemulen)
Kousei Tomita (Heisei Tensai Bakabon: Bakabon's Papa)
Hisahiro Ogura (Rerere's Tensai Bakabon: Bakabon's Papa)
Shingo Kanemoto (Ai Shite Knight: Juliano)

Dubbing Actors

Ward Bond 

 The Wings of Eagles (John Dodge) (1973 Tokyo Channel 12 Dub)
 3 Godfathers (Sheriff Buck Sweet) (1974 NET Dub)
 The Searchers (Rev. Capt. Samuel Johnson Clayton) (1973 NET Dub)
 The Long Gray Line (Captain Herman Koehler) (1972 NET Dub)
 Mister Roberts (Chief Petty Officer Dowdy) (1974 NET Dub)
 Rio Bravo (Pat Wheeler) (1977 NET Dub)

Fernando Sancho 

 Per Il Gusto Di Uccidere (Sánchez) (1972 Fuji TV Dub)
 Django Shoots First (Gordon) (Unknown TV Dub)

Dubbing Roles

Films 
 Warlords of Atlantis (Grogan) (1981 TV Asahi Dub)
 To Kill a Mockingbird (Reverend Sykes) (1972 NET Dub)
 Zorro (Sergeant García) (1977 NET Dub)
 Day of Anger (Sheriff Nigel) (1970 NET Dub)
 Fighting Mad (Jeff Hunter) (1980 TBS Dub)
 Some Like It Hot (Little Bonaparte) (1967 NET Dub)
 The Wolf Man (Lawrence Talbot) (1964 NET Dub)
 How to Steal a Million (Charles Bonnet) (TV Tokyo Dub)
 The Cassandra Crossing (Max the Conductor) (1979 NTV Dub)
 The Enemy Below (Oberleutnant zur See "Heinie" Schwaffer) (1980 TV Asahi Dub)
 The Brides of Dracula (Doctor Tobler) (1975 Fuji TV Dub)
 Madigan (Chief of Detectives Hap Lynch) (1978 TV Asahi Dub)
 The Getaway (Cowboy) (1982 TV Asahi Dub)
The Paleface (TV Kanagawa Dub)
The Godfather Part II (Frank Pentangeli) (1980 NTV Dub)
A Dandy in Aspic (Unknown TV Dub)
Psycho (Al Chambers) (1975 Fuji TV Dub)
Samson and Delilah (1971 Fuji TV Dub)
The Quiet Man (Squire "Red" Will Danaher) (1971 Fuji TV Dub)
Kill Them All and Come Back Alone (Fuji TV Dub)
The Seven Year Itch (1973 Fuji TV Dub)
The Day of the Jackal (Montclair) (1977 NTV and 1978 TV Asahi Dubs)
Witness for the Prosecution (Wilfred Roberts) (1972 NET Dub)
After The Fox (Okra) ( TV Asahi Dub)
Long Live Your Death (Max Lozoya) (Unknown TV Dub)
Sabata (Carrincha) (1976 TBS Dub)
Casino Royale (Le Cheffre) (1972 NTV Dub)
Mutiny on the Bounty (Alexander Smith) (1974 NET Dub)
The Bridge on The River Kwai (Private Grogan) (1976 Fuji TV Dub)
St. Ives (Blunt) (1982 Fuji TV Dub)
Return of the Seven (Frank) (1974 NET Dub, plays Fransisco Lorca in the 1976 TBS Dub)
Beneath The Planet of the Apes (Adiposo) (1974 TBS Dub)
Tarzan And The Great River (Unknown TV Dub)
All the President's Men (Harry M Rosenfield) (1980 TBS Dub)
Tobruk (1971 NET Dub)
Smokey and the Bandit (Big Enos) (1982)
Django Kill!... If You Live, Shoot! (Sorrow) (1977 TBS Dub)
Around the World in 80 Days (Inspector Fix) (1972 NET Dub)
The Delicate Delinquent (Captain Riley) (Fuji TV Dub)
The Plainsman (1971 NET Dub)
Pocketful of Miracles (Junior) (1970 NET Dub)
Mackenna's Gold (1979 TV Asahi Dub)
Guess Who's Coming to Dinner (Mr. Prentice) (Unknown TV Dub)
Le Roi de Cœur (1974 NET Dub)
My Name is Nobody (John) (1980 Fuji TV Dub)
The Italian Job (Professor Simon Peach) (In-Flight Screening Version)
The Great Northfield Minnesota Raid (Allen) (1976 NET Dub)
Too Late the Hero (Unknown TV Dub)
For a Few Dollars More (Sancho Perez) (1973 NET Dub)
The Young Master (Ah Suk) (1983 Fuji TV Dub)
Sergeant York ("Pusher" Ross) (1967 NET Dub)
Who Is Killing the Great Chefs of Europe? (Louis Cohner) (1982 Fuji TV Dub)
The Wild Geese (Regimental Sergeant Major Sandy Young) (1980 TV Asahi)
The Wild Bunch (Coffer) (1974 NET Dub)
Valdez Is Coming (El Segundo)

References

External links
Official agency profile 

1930 births
1984 deaths
Aoni Production voice actors
Deaths from cirrhosis
Japanese male video game actors
Japanese male voice actors
Male voice actors from Chiba Prefecture
Alcohol-related deaths in Japan